Cosmin Grigore Vancea (born 24 December 1984) is a Romanian former footballer who played as a striker for teams such as: ASA 1962 Târgu Mureș, Gaz Metan Mediaș, ASA 2013 Târgu Mureș, CS Turnu Severin or Bintang Medan, among others.

References

External links
 
 

People from Mureș County
1984 births
Living people
Romanian footballers
Association football forwards
Liga I players
Liga II players
CS Gaz Metan Mediaș players
ASA 2013 Târgu Mureș players
CS Turnu Severin players
ASC Oțelul Galați players
FC Politehnica Iași (2010) players
Persian Gulf Pro League players
Saipa F.C. players
Romanian expatriate footballers
Romanian expatriate sportspeople in Indonesia
Expatriate footballers in Indonesia
Romanian expatriate sportspeople in Iran
Expatriate footballers in Iran